Line 6 is a partially operational subway line of the Hangzhou Metro. It connects Fuyang District with Binjiang District, Hangzhou Olympic Sports Expo Center, Qianjiang Century City and Hangzhou East Railway Station.

Phase 1 and Fuyang Section was opened on 30 December 2020. Phase 2 opened on 6 November 2021. The line's color is blue. In future planning, the stations from Shuangpu to Xiaming Street will merge to Line 12.

Opening timeline

Stations
Legend
 - Operational
 - Under construction

See also
 Hangzhou Metro

References

06
Railway lines opened in 2020
2020 establishments in China
Standard gauge railways in China